Randall Parks Frazier II (born November 20, 1991) is an American football coach who is the passing game coordinator for the Carolina Panthers of the National Football League (NFL).

Coaching career 
Frazier began his coaching career at Samford as a defensive quality control during the 2015 spring season. He spent the 2015 season at Middle Tennessee State as a defensive intern before joining the coaching staff at Arkansas State as a graduate assistant.

Indianapolis Colts 
At the recommendation of his former college teammate, Frazier was hired by the Indianapolis Colts as the assistant to head coach Frank Reich in 2018. He was an offensive quality control coach in 2020 before being promoted to assistant quarterbacks coach in 2021. In 2022, he became the offensive play caller for the Colts after Jeff Saturday was hired as the interim head coach following Reich's firing.

Personal life 
Frazier is married to Caroline Cann, a former reporter for the Colts' website. The couple were wed by Frank Reich.

Frazier's house was damaged by 77 rounds in a shooting in 2019. No residents were home and no injuries were reported. The targeting of Frazier's house was later ruled a mistake.

References

External links 
 
 Indianapolis Colts profile

1991 births
Living people
People from Corinth, Mississippi
Players of American football from Mississippi
Coaches of American football from Mississippi
American football quarterbacks
Northeast Mississippi Tigers football players
Murray State Racers football players
Samford Bulldogs football coaches
Middle Tennessee Blue Raiders football coaches
Arkansas State Red Wolves football coaches
Indianapolis Colts coaches
Carolina Panthers coaches